The following outline is provided as an overview of and topical guide to Christmas Island:

Christmas Island is a small territory of Australia located in the Indian Ocean, 2600 kilometres (1600 mi) northwest of Perth in Western Australia, 500 kilometres (300 mi) south of Jakarta, Indonesia, and 975 km ENE of the Cocos (Keeling) Islands.  Christmas Island supports about 1,600 residents, who live in a number of "settlement areas" on the northern tip of the island: Flying Fish Cove (also known as Kampong), Silver City, Poon Saan and Drumsite.

General reference

 Pronunciation:
 Common English country name:  Christmas Island
 Official English country name:  The Australian Territory of Christmas Island
 Common endonym(s):  
 Official endonym(s):  
 Adjectival(s): Christmas Island
 Demonym(s):
 ISO country codes: CX, CXR, 162
 ISO region codes: See ISO 3166-2:CX
 Internet country code top-level domain: .cx

Geography of Christmas Island 

Geography of Christmas Island
 Christmas Island is: an island and territory of Australia
 Location:
 Southern Hemisphere and Eastern Hemisphere
 Eurasia (though not on the mainland)
 Asia
 Southeast Asia
 Maritime Southeast Asia
 Time zone:  UTC+07
 Extreme points of Christmas Island
 High:  Murray Hill 
 Low:  Indian Ocean 0 m
 Land boundaries:  none
 Coastline:  138.9 km
 Population of Christmas Island: 

 Area of Christmas Island: 135 km2
 Atlas of Christmas Island

Environment of Christmas Island 

 Climate of Christmas Island
 Environmental issues on Christmas Island
 Renewable energy in Christmas Island
 Geology of Christmas Island
 Protected areas of Christmas Island
 Biosphere reserves in Christmas Island
 National parks of Christmas Island
 Wildlife of Christmas Island
 Fauna of Christmas Island
 Birds of Christmas Island
 Mammals of Christmas Island

Natural geographic features of Christmas Island 

 Fjords of Christmas Island
 Glaciers of Christmas Island
 Islands of Christmas Island
 Lakes of Christmas Island
 Mountains of Christmas Island
 Volcanoes in Christmas Island
 Rivers of Christmas Island
 Waterfalls of Christmas Island
 World Heritage Sites in Christmas Island: None

Regions of Christmas Island 

Regions of Christmas Island

Ecoregions of Christmas Island 

Ecoregions in Christmas Island

Administrative divisions of Christmas Island 
None

Municipalities of Christmas Island 

 Capital of Christmas Island: Flying Fish Cove
 Cities of Christmas Island

Demography of Christmas Island 

Demographics of Christmas Island

Government and politics of Christmas Island 

Government of Christmas Island
 Form of government: local government area
 Capital of Christmas Island: Flying Fish Cove
 Elections in Christmas Island

Branches of government

Government of Christmas Island

 Supreme Court of Christmas Island

Foreign relations of Christmas Island 

Foreign relations of Christmas Island
 List of diplomatic missions of Christmas Island

International organization membership 
none

Law and order in Christmas Island 

Law of Christmas Island
 Law enforcement in Christmas Island

History of Christmas Island 

History of Christmas Island
 Military history of Christmas Island

Culture of Christmas Island 

Culture of Christmas Island
 Architecture of Christmas Island
 Cuisine of Christmas Island
 Festivals in Christmas Island
 Languages of Christmas Island
 Media in Christmas Island
 National symbols of Christmas Island
 Coat of arms of Christmas Island
 Flag of Christmas Island
 National anthem of Christmas Island
 People of Christmas Island
 Public holidays in Christmas Island
 Records of Christmas Island
 Religion in Christmas Island
 Christianity in Christmas Island
 Hinduism in Christmas Island
 Islam in Christmas Island
 Judaism in Christmas Island
 Sikhism in Christmas Island
 World Heritage Sites in Christmas Island: None

Art in Christmas Island 
 Art in Christmas Island
 Cinema of Christmas Island
 Literature of Christmas Island
 Music of Christmas Island
 Television in Christmas Island
 Theatre in Christmas Island

Economy and infrastructure of Christmas Island 

Economy of Christmas Island
 Economic rank, by nominal GDP (2007):
 Internet in Christmas Island
 Companies of Christmas Island
Currency of Christmas Island: Dollar
ISO 4217: AUD
 Energy in Christmas Island
 Energy policy of Christmas Island
 Oil industry in Christmas Island
 Mining in Christmas Island
 Tourism in Christmas Island
 Christmas Island Resort
 Transport in Christmas Island

Education in Christmas Island 

Education in Christmas Island

Infrastructure of Christmas Island
 Health care in Christmas Island
 Transportation in Christmas Island
 Airports in Christmas Island
 Rail transport in Christmas Island
 Roads in Christmas Island

See also 

Christmas Island

Index of Christmas Island–related articles
List of Christmas Island-related topics
List of international rankings
Outline of Asia
Outline of Australia
Outline of geography

References

External links

 Christmas Island Shire - official government website
 Christmas Island Tourism Association - official tourism website
 Christmas Island Act 1958
 
 
 Christmas Island. The World Factbook. Central Intelligence Agency.
 Christmas Island Travel Guide from Unearth Travel a creative commons travel wiki

 
Christmas Island